Rhizagrotis stylata is a moth of the family Noctuidae first described by John Bernhardt Smith in 1893. It is found in North America from south-eastern Alberta south to at least Arizona.

The wingspan is 38–40 mm.

Subspecies
Rhizagrotis stylata stylata
Rhizagrotis stylata arida

References

Cuculliinae
Moths of North America